The 12"/35 caliber gun (spoken "twelve-inch-thirty-five–caliber") were used for the primary batteries of the United States Navy's "New Navy" monitors  and   and the battleships  and .

Mark 1
The Mark 1, gun Nos. 1–8, was constructed of gun steel, having a tube, jacket, ten hoops and a locking ring. The Mod 0, the original design, had the inner hoop starting  from the breech and running out to the muzzle, with the Mod 1 being hooped from breech to muzzle.

Mark 2
The Mark 2, gun Nos. 9–14 and 57, was of similar construction to the Mark 1 but with seven hoops starting from the breech and running out to the muzzle. The Mark 2 Mod 1 and Mod 2 were also given a new nickel-steel liner.

Incident
Gun No. 9, mounted in Iowas forward turret in the left-hand position, was damaged on 9 April 1903, off Pensacola, Florida, when the chase, forward of the "D" hoop, was blown off during target practice. The gun had been assembled in 1895 at the US Naval Gun Factory. The gun had fired 127 rounds with the accident happening on the 128th round. No one inside the turret were injured, but fragments of the chase were driven through the deck under the muzzle killing three men on the deck below; four others were slightly wounded. The gun was removed and sent back to the Naval Gun Factory to be examined by a special board. Their theory was that a pressure wave had built up from the burning of older smokeless powder used.

Naval Service

See also

Weapons of comparable role, performance and era 
 12-inch gun M1895 - contemporary US Army coast defense weapon
 BL 12-inch Mk VIII naval gun - contemporary British naval weapon
 Canon de 305 mm Modèle 1893/96 gun - contemporary French naval and railway weapon

Notes

References

Books
 
 
Online sources

External links

 Bluejackets Manual, 1917, 4th revision: US Navy 14-inch Mark 1 gun

Naval guns of the United States
305 mm artillery